South Fork may refer to:

In municipalities

In Canada
 South Fork, Saskatchewan

In the USA
 Big South Fork National River and Recreation Area, in northeastern Tennessee and southeastern Kentucky
 South Fork, Butte County, California
 South Fork, Madera County, California
 South Fork, Mendocino County, California
 South Fork, Colorado
 South Fork, Missouri
 South Fork, Nevada
 South Fork, Pennsylvania
 South Fork, Wisconsin, a town
 South Fork (community), Wisconsin, an unincorporated community
 South Fork Township (disambiguation)

In rivers
 Big South Fork of the Cumberland River
 South Fork American River
 South Fork Eel River
 South Fork Grand River (South Dakota)
 South Fork Holston River
 South Fork John Day River
 South Fork Musselshell River
 South Fork Rio Grande
 South Fork Shenandoah River 
 South Fork Spring River
 South Fork Trinity River

In other uses
 South Fork, Suffolk County, New York, a peninsula
 South Fork Dam, a dam in Pennsylvania
 South Fork Fishing and Hunting Club
 South Fork High School, a public high school in Stuart, Florida

See also
Southfork (disambiguation)